Oontoo is a former outback town within the locality of Durham in the Shire of Bullo, Queensland, Australia.

Geography 
Oontoo is in South West Queensland, immediately east of the border with South Australia.

History 
The township of Oontoo once existed in the area along the banks of the Cooper Creek. The Queensland Government offered approximately 70 town lots for sale on 11 April 1886. A border customs post was established at Oontoo in 1886 on a  piece of land resumed from Nappa Merrie cattle station. The post was created to collect taxes from drovers who crossed to Queensland border travelling down Strzelecki Creek.

The first customs officer was Mr Ivory who arrived in 1886 and lived in a tent until a house was completed the following year. In 1887 the post was also used as a depot for materials used in the construction of the rabbit proof fence.

A shanty public house followed soon afterward with a more substantial stone hotel built by Thomas Costello in 1888. The hotel had eight rooms, kitchen, stables and a store. Several race meetings were held in the town starting in 1888. The town soon boasted a store, doctor and school.

Severe flooding occurred in 1891 with Cooper Creek breaking its banks after  of rain fell in the area in January.

By 1897 the population had shrunk to 14.

The customs post was closed in 1902.

References

South West Queensland
Shire of Bulloo